Daboia palaestinae, also known as  the Palestine viper, is a viper species endemic to the Levant. Like all vipers, it is venomous. It is considered a leading cause of snakebite within its range. No subspecies are currently recognized.

Description

Geographic range
It is found in northern and central Israel, Palestine, western Syria, northwestern Jordan, and Lebanon. Mallow et al. (2003) describe the range as relatively restricted, with the distribution being concentrated in the Mediterranean coastal plains to the inland hills of Lebanon and Israel, along with the adjoining regions of Syria and Jordan.

The type locality given is "Haifa, Israel".

Conservation status
This species is classified as Least Concern (LC) according to the IUCN Red List of Threatened Species (v3.1, 2001). It was given this status due to its relatively wide distribution, the fact that it is found in a wide range of habitats, its presumed large population, and because it is unlikely to be declining fast enough to qualify for listing in a more threatened category. The population trend is unknown. Year assessed: 2005.

In 2018 the viper was declared Israel's national snake.

Taxonomy
The classification of this species has resulted in much taxonomic controversy. Before Franz Werner (1938), this snake was included in Montivipera xanthina, and subsequently synonymized with V. lebetina by Boulenger (1896). Mertens (1952) moved it back to M. xanthina as a subspecies, and more recently a number of authorities, including Obst (1983) and Mallow et al. (2003) have included it as part of the genus Daboia. The result is that many studies related to this medically significant species have been published under different scientific names.

References

Further reading
Golay P, Smith HM, Dixon JR, McCarthy CJ, Rage J-C, Schätti B, Toriba M. 1993. Endoglyphs and Other Venomous Snakes of the World. Geneva: Azemiops. 478 pp.
Werner F. 1938. Eine verkannte Viper ( Vipera palaestinae n. sp.). Zoologischer Anzeiger 122: 313-318.

External links

 

palaestinae
Fauna of Lebanon
Fauna of the Middle East
Reptiles of the Middle East
Snakes of Jordan
Reptiles described in 1938
Taxa named by Franz Werner